Mams Taylor is a British boxing promoter, singer, songwriter and producer of Persian descent. He is most known for his song ‘Girl Gotta Girlfriend’, released in 2009 and also for being the CEO of Proper Loud Music.

Career

Music career 
Taylor's song "LA Girls" featuring Joel Madden of Good Charlotte was featured on the MTV show, The Hills. In addition to Taylor, the music video for "LA Girls" also stars UFC champion Quinton Jackson, Mila Kunis, and Carmen Electra.

A later single of Taylor's called "Girls Gotta Girlfriend" featured Snoop Dogg, and Bobby Valentino was inspired by the openness about female bisexuality in Hollywood.  Taylor participated in the NOH8 Campaign which promotes marriage, gender, and human equality.

In May 2013, Taylor teamed up with producer Ben Rico and formed the production/ writing duo called Feelabeat. They produced and wrote a single for Carmen Electra, titled "Bigger Dick".

"United for Neda" 
Taylor wrote and produced "United for Neda", which is a protest song recorded in English and Persian versions by many famous Iranian expatriates. It was inspired by the plight of Neda Agha-Soltan, a 26-year-old Iranian woman who was fatally shot on the streets of Tehran on 20 June 2010 by the Basij. Her death was recorded on a mobile phone video and received international attention when it hit the Internet.

Other credits 
Taylor invested one million dollars into Lady Gaga's career before she had commercially released any music and worked closely with her team as part of Coalition and Atom Factory. However, it ended up in a dispute which appears to have been settled.

Taylor has written, produced and collaborated with a wide range of notable artists, such as Tiësto, Good Charlotte, Travis Barker, Robbie Williams, Rico Love, Billy Idol, T-Pain, Lil' Kim, The Game, Papa Roach, Snoop Dogg, Rodney Jerkins, Scott Storch, Dave Navarro, among others.

In May 2013, Taylor teamed up with producer Ben Rico and formed the production/ writing duo called Feelabeat. They produced and wrote a single for Carmen Electra, titled "Bigger Dick".

Taylor executive produced former Pussycat Doll Jessica Sutta's debut album, which charted in numerous territories and also achieved two number-ones on the Billboard Dance charts. 

He also executive produced KSI's debut album Dissimulation, which debuted at number 2 on the UK Albums Chart and also reached the charts in 13 other countries.

Proper Loud 
Taylor owns a talent management company and record label called Proper Loud (formally Premier League Music), representing songwriter Rico Love, producer Diego Ave, artist and producer S-X, YouTuber and musician KSI, Internet personality King Bach, YouTube couple GoldJuice, photographer Nathan James, musician Nachi West, singer and songwriter Aiyana-Lee, TikTok star Katy Ford, as well as musicians Jono, Tania and Yoshi, among others.

Proper Loud has achieved a number of accolades, 21 plaques of gold or platinum status, representing their clients and also for Taylor's creative involvement. Over the years, Taylor has facilitated major deals for his clients in publishing, recording and selling of catalogues. He earned a major deal for his client, Rico Love, with Hipgnosis Songs Fund.

Since the inception of Misfits Boxing, Proper Loud has signed Deen the Great, Slim Albaher, and Hasim Rahman Jr..

The Online Takeover 
On 16 February 2021, Taylor and KSI partnered for the creation of the label named "The Online Takeover". first signee of the label was American-British singer Aiyana-Lee, who featured on the track "Killa Killa". On 13 May 2022, KSI announced that he and Proper Loud have signed Yxng Dave to The Online Takeover, marking him the second artist to be signed to the label.

Misfits Boxing 
On 22 June 2021,Taylor partnered KSI, and the Wasserman Promotions to create Misfits Boxing.

Personal life 
Taylor has a passion for mixed martial arts fighting and currently trains at PKG LA. He appeared in Fight Magazine in 2009.

On 10 October 2010, Taylor married actress Krista Allen. Allen filed for divorce at the Los Angeles County Superior Court on 12 February 2012.

Controversies

Hitting Jesse Metcalfe 
A video of Taylor hitting actor Jesse Metcalfe has been repeatedly featured on the television program TMZ.

Misfits Boxing mismatches 
Taylor is the match maker for most of the bouts under Misfits Boxing. Many have criticised the matchmaking stating that most of the bouts are "mismatches" with examples such as; KSI vs Swarmz, Salt Papi vs Andy Warski, Jay Swingler vs Cherdleys and Hasim Rahman Jr. vs Greg Hardy which had a 100 Ibs difference between the two fighters. AnEsonGib called out Taylor on Twitter stating "You’re trying to throw me under the bus for the backlash of your poor match making. What number we at now, 11 mismatched fights this year."

Discography

Studio albums

Mixtapes

Singles

Other credits

Awards and nominations

References

Living people
Year of birth missing (living people)
English people of Iranian descent
British expatriates in the United States
English hip hop musicians
English male singer-songwriters
English record producers
People from Cricklewood
Rappers from London